Neighborhood Councils in the City of Los Angeles are city-certified local groups made up of people who live, work, own property or have some other connection to a neighborhood. Neighborhood Council Board Members are elected or selected to their positions by the neighborhoods themselves. There are currently 99 Neighborhood Councils within the city limits, and a corresponding Department of Neighborhood Empowerment within City Hall.

History

In 1999, voters approved a new City Charter that established the Neighborhood Council System and the Department of Neighborhood Empowerment “to promote more citizen participation in government and make government more responsive to local needs…”. Specifically, the charter ensures each neighborhood council receives early warning of upcoming city decisions and has the opportunity to be heard.

The charter also requires that neighborhood councils be consulted in the budget process. Article IX, Section 909 of the city charter mandates that each neighborhood council “may present to the Mayor and Council an annual list of priorities for the City budget.” The mayor must “inform certified neighborhood councils of the deadline for submission so that the input may be considered in a timely fashion.”

Public participation
 Membership

The standard for membership is often more liberal than the location-specific approach used by most political subdivisions ("you vote where your house is" standard).  Participation is based on "stakeholder status"—a broader definition—a businessperson or someone representing a local church, or hospital, or charity would qualify—on that basis—even if they do not live in the exact area.  Several positions on neighborhood councils may be set off—specifically—to guarantee that those local business people, church, and charity participants are included.  This resident—local businessperson alliance hopefully encourages acceptable, practical, economic development for an area.

 Meetings

To effect their interests, neighborhood councils organize a monthly "town meeting", not unlike the historic model demonstrated in New England towns.  An agenda is posted on issues under discussion, relevant community reps or City of LA or LAPD officials may be invited, discussion is opened to members of the council and the public attending, and then the council votes to take its position. Basic parliamentary rules are followed, and the California standard for open public meetings, the Brown Act, guarantee designated "public comment" periods.

Organizational structure

Administration

The neighborhood councils have been allocated $32,000 each per year for administration, outreach and approved neighborhood projects.

Vision
The vision of a citywide system of independent and influential neighborhood councils, and the creation of a city department to guide that process, was the centerpiece of the new City Charter that was approved by the voters in June 1999.  There are currently (as of early 2019) more than 90 neighborhood councils in the City of Los Angeles, and a list of neighborhood councils can be found on the Department of Neighborhood Empowerment's website.

Mission statement
To promote public participation in government and make government more responsive to local needs by creating, nurturing, and supporting a citywide system of grass-roots, independent, and participatory neighborhood councils.

The Department of Neighborhood Empowerment Pledge

 We will treat the public with courtesy and respect.
 When explaining a restriction, making a suggestion, or reporting a delay, we will always explain the reason why.
 We will ensure that people who call during working hours will always have an opportunity to speak to someone.
 We will avoid using insider or bureaucratic language.
 We will be good listeners.
 We will honor the Mayor's "no wrong door" policy, and never use the words, "It's not my job!" We will find out whose job it is.
 We will never say, "Because that's the way we've always done it," or "We tried it that way once but it didn't work."
 We will keep the promises we make.
 We believe that everyone deserves an answer.
 We will strive to be the best friend that neighborhood councils have.

 The Plan for a Citywide System of Neighborhood Councils (Plan)

Starting with a skeleton staff in 1999, the Department of Neighborhood Empowerment held 16 public workshops throughout the city to begin teaching people about grass-roots participatory democracy, and to hear the public's needs, dreams, and suggestions. By the time the Plan for a Citywide System of Neighborhood Councils (Plan) was adopted, nearly 50 more public hearings had been held.

Plan
The Plan was approved on May 25, 2001 by the City Council through an ordinance. The Department of Neighborhood Empowerment (DONE) and the Board of Neighborhood Commissioners reviewed years of extensive study regarding neighborhood councils, and received months of public comment before presenting a proposed plan to the Mayor and City Council in December, 2000. For six months, City Council committees received public comment on the proposed plan, and made revisions before submitting it to the Mayor for final approval in May, 2001. The Plan establishes a flexible framework through which people in neighborhoods may be empowered to create neighborhood councils to serve their needs. The Plan also sets minimum standards to ensure that neighborhood councils represent all stakeholders in the community, conduct fair and open meetings, and are financially accountable.

Formation
Neighborhood councils are groups of people that, once certified by the Board of Neighborhood Commissioners, will elect or select their own leaders, determine their own agendas, and set their own boundaries. The goal is to make them as independent as possible from government so that they will have the influence and power to affect citywide and local decision-making far beyond what neighborhood groups have done. People would be truly empowered to guide the futures of their neighborhoods.

Functions and services

Through the Early Notification System (ENS), neighborhood councils receive notice of issues and projects that are important to them as soon as possible. In this way, they will have a reasonable amount of time to understand, discuss, and develop positions before final decisions are made.

Neighborhood councils are first formulated to fit coherent neighborhoods within the City, from a process to elect a council certified by the Board of Neighborhood Commissioners.  With an approved charter of organization, neighborhood councils are set free, in principle, forever, to run their open neighborhood elections and continue.  Residents inside the neighborhood council area are empowered to elect a board, which then chooses its  own leaders, determines its own agendas, and take locally discussed positions on issues of zoning, policing, community development, and the design of the Los Angeles City Charter. The goal is to make neighborhood councils independent from elected officials, and street-savvy enough to define their own community's positions on public issues so that they can develop the influence and power to affect citywide and local decision-making.

City Hall and other councils

A funding level of $50,000 a year per Neighborhood Council was established—to be used for any appropriate community use—with a dedicated percentage on outreach and community building—subject to City of Los Angeles auditing and contracting standards. This has since been reduced to $32,000 per NC per year.

List of Neighborhood Councils

References

External links
 EmpowerLA
 North Area Neighborhood Development Council 
 Venice Neighborhood Council
 Palms Neighborhood Council
 Sherman Oaks Neighborhood Council
 Highland Park Neighborhood Council
 Winnetka Neighborhood Council
 North Westwood Neighborhood Council
 Panorama City Neighborhood Council
 Hermon Neighborhood Council
 Woodland Hills-Warner Center Neighborhood Council
 [http://eccandc.org
 DTLA Neighborhood Council
Government of Los Angeles